This is a list of French football transfers for the 2012 winter transfer window. The winter transfer window opened on 1 January 2012, although a few transfers took place prior to that date, and closed at midnight on 31 January 2012. Only moves involving Ligue 1 and Ligue 2 clubs are listed. Players without a club may join one at any time, either during or in between transfer windows.

Transfers

 Player who signed with club before 1 January officially joined his new club on 1 January 2012, while player who joined after 1 January joined his new club following his signature of the contract.

References

External links
 Ligue 1 Transfers
 Ligue 2 Transfers

Transfers
French
2011-12